The Enchiridion on Faith, Hope and Love (also called the Manual or Handbook) is a compact treatise on Christian piety written by Augustine of Hippo in response to a request by an otherwise unknown person, named Laurentius, shortly after the death of Saint Jerome in 420.  It is intended as a model for Christian instruction or catechesis.

As the title indicates, the work is organized according to the three graces necessary for the Christian worship of God: Faith, Hope and Love.  Under Faith, Augustine explains the use of the Apostles' Creed, in teaching Christian doctrine and in refuting heresies.  Under Hope, he briefly explains the Lord's Prayer as a model of Christian prayer. The final part is a discourse on Christian love.

References

External links
 
 Full text of the Enchiridion at Christian Classics Ethereal Library
 Albert C. Outler translation of the Enchiridion
 

5th-century Christian texts
Works by Augustine of Hippo